Moslem Bahadori (22 January 1927 – 21 April 2022) was an Iranian medical scientist, pathologist, and a university lecturer. In 1973, Bahadori along with Averill Abraham Liebow, reported the first case of plasma cell granuloma, a benign tumor of the lung.

Education and career
Bahadori studied medicine at medical school, Tehran University (1954), and specialized in pathology at the Department of Pathology, Tehran University (1957). He did his post-graduate studies at Cardiff University (1959).

Bahadori was an expert on Cardiopulmonary pathology. Bahadori was one of the youngest faculty members of Tehran University who has been promoted to full professorship. He was also an invited lecturer and Fulbright Visiting Professor at University of California San Diego.

He was also a member of Iranian Academy of Medical Sciences and Chairman, Section on Basic Medical Sciences. Prof Bahadori was a member of editorial boards of several scientific journals including American Journal of Cardiovascular Pathology and Archives of Iranian Medicine.

Bahadori devoted his life to the development of basic and clinical medical sciences in Iran and also to the development of scientific Persian language. His role in the development of modern medicine in Iran and medical education was significant.

He was a representative of Iran in World Health Organization (WHO). Bahadori was Emeritus Professor of School of Medicine, Tehran University.

Awards
Iran's Eternal Figure
Permanent member of Iranian Academy of Medical Sciences

See also 
Iranian science
Intellectual movements in Iran

Notes

External links
 Moslem Bahadori's publications in pubmed

1927 births
2022 deaths
Academic staff of Tehran University of Medical Sciences
Iranian pathologists
Iranian scientists
University of Tehran alumni
People from Tonekabon
Distinguished professors in Iran